Tom som is a sour soup of Thai origin which usually contains seafood or chicken.

Etymology 

The word tom means "boil", and som means "sour".

History 

The soup is typically made in northern Thailand. According to Chumpol Jangprai, the Thai word "som" has traditionally been used to describe anything that is sour.

Ingredients 

According to Thai chef Bo Songvisava, the broth includes a sour ingredient such as sour tamarind (som makaam), bilimbi (taling pling), nipa palm vinegar (nam som jaak), or roselle flowers (dok krajieb sod) in a chili paste including krill paste (kapi), coriander root, fish sauce, and shallot. Usually a seafood such as shrimp or fish or other meat such as chicken is added near the end of preparation time.

Production method 

The ingredients are simmered to make a broth, then often strained through a sieve or cheesecloth. Just before serving, small pieces of seafood or chicken are added and simmered just until cooked.

Serving 

Tom som soups are eaten as a meal, as part of a meal, or as aahaan kap klaem (drinking food.

See also 

 List of soups
 Kaeng som
 Tom kha
 Tom khlong
 Tom yum
 Thai cuisine

References 

Thai soups